Trestonia pyralis is a species of beetle in the family Cerambycidae. It was described by Dillon and Dillon in 1946. It is known from Panama and Costa Rica.

References

pyralis
Beetles described in 1946